11/6 may refer to:
November 6 (month-day date notation)
June 11 (day-month date notation)
11 shillings and 6 pence in UK predecimal currency

See also
116 (disambiguation)
6/11 (disambiguation)